Sekadau Regency is a regency of West Kalimantan province of Indonesia. It was created on 18 December 2003 from part of Sanggau Regency. It covers an area of 5,444.2 km2, and had a population of 181,634 at the 2010 Census and 211,559 at the 2020 Census; the official estimate as at mid 2021 was 212,878. The regency seat lies at Sekadau in Sekadau Hilir District.

History

Geography

Climate 
Sekadau has a tropical rainforest climate (Af) with heavy to very heavy rainfall year-round.

Governance

Administrative districts 
Sekadau Regency consists of seven districts (kecamatan), tabulated below with their areas and their populations at the 2010 Census and the 2020 Census, together with the official estimates as at mid 2021. The table also includes the locations of the district administrative centres, the number of villages (rural desa and urban kelurahan) in each district, and its post code.

Local government 
The regency is a second-level administrative division equivalent to a city. As a regency, it is headed by a regent who is elected democratically. Head of districts are appointed directly by the regent with the recommendation of the regency secretary. Executive power lies with the regent and vice regent, while legislative function is exercised by the regency's parliament.

Politics

Economy

Demographics

Infrastructure

Education 
As of 2020, there are 35 kindergartens in the regency, 241 elementary schools, 67 junior highschools, and 23 senior highschools. In addition, the regency has six vocational highschools. It only has one higher educational institutions, Keling Kumang Institute, which is private but partially supported by regency government. The institute campus is located at town of Sekadau and focus on technology-related programs such as agrotechnology and computer. The regency also has one public library maintained by regency government, also located on its regency seat, town of Sekadau.

There are also four Islamic boarding schools (pesantren) in the regency as of 2020.

Healthcare 
The regency has one hospital, four polyclinics, 67 puskesmas, and 6 pharmacy. The only hospital in the regency, Sekadau Regional Hospital, is a public hospital owned by regency government. It is classified as C-class by Ministry of Health and located just across the town of Sekadau. In addition, there are two family planning clinics, 10 village medical clinics, 239 healthcare posts, and 109 maternity cottages.

Transportation 
There are 852.85 kilometers of road in the regency, out of which 584.501 kilometers are maintained by regency government. From those 584.501 kilometers, 115.436 kilometers have not yet sealed and still has soil surface as of 2020. There's no airport in the regency and the main transportation is using road travel. The closest airport is Tebelian Airport which is located on Sintang Regency.

Others 
There are exactly 272 mosques, 149 Protestant churches, 303 Catholic churches, three Chinese Buddhist temples (Vihara), and seven Confucianist temple (klenteng).

References

Regencies of West Kalimantan